Cornel Lucas (12 September 19208 November 2012) was a British photographer, who as a film still photographer was a pioneer of film portraiture in the 1940s and 1950s.

He was the first photographer to win a BAFTA in 1998 for Services to British Film Industry.

Cornel Lucas published two books of his work, Heads and Tales and Shooting Stars.

Exhibited internationally. Permanent collection at National Portrait Gallery (London), National Media Museum and London's Photographers' Gallery

Cornel Lucas photographed many movies stars in the late forties and fifties including Marlene Dietrich, David Niven, Gregory Peck, Robert Newton, Joan Collins, Yvonne de Carlo, Diana Dors (in a gondola in Venice). He was in charge of the photographic studios set up by the Rank Organisation.

Personal life
He was married to Belinda Lee in 1954, but divorced in 1959, when he married the actress Susan Travers. They had four children together, including actress Charlotte Lucas.

References

External links 
 
 
 Interview British Entertainment History Project

1920 births
2012 deaths
BAFTA winners (people)
Photographers from London
People from Highbury
Movie stills photographers